Shrawan Ghimire is an Indian actor and film producer associated with Nepali language films. Ghimire has been involved in many commercially successful films including Lahure, Dui Thopa Aansu and Darpan Chaya. He and his brother Tulsi Ghimire's pair is regarded as the most successful and qualitative producer−director pair. his son's name is siddhartha ghimire.

Filmography
Ghimire has been cast in movies such as:

See also
Cinema of Nepal

References

Living people
Year of birth missing (living people)
Place of birth missing (living people)
Actors from Kathmandu
Nepalese film producers
20th-century Nepalese male actors
21st-century Nepalese male actors
Khas people
Nepali-language singers from India